Sycamore Hills Golf Course is located in Fort Wayne, Indiana, United States. Sycamore Hills is a private 18-hole golf course that was designed by Jack Nicklaus, and constructed in 1987 on the former estate of a prominent Fort Wayne-area family.

Major tournaments hosted
In 2013, Sycamore Hills hosted the inaugural Hotel Fitness Championship, which was won by Trevor Immelman. The club hosted the tournament through 2015. 

Previously, Sycamore Hills hosted the Junior PGA Championship, U.S. Open and U.S. Amateur qualifiers, the Indiana State Amateur, the Indiana State Senior Amateur, the Indiana PGA Section Championship, PGA Professional National Championship qualifier, Mid-West Collegiate Tournament, the USGA Women's State Team Championship and Jack Nicklaus Cup Matches.

Honors
1993–2004, 2007–2012: Ranked by Golf Digest as one of "America's 100 Greatest Golf Courses"
1994–2001, 2011: Ranked on by Golf World as one of "America’s 100 Best Golf Shops," Top 25 Private Clubs
2009: Ranked by Golf Digest as one of the "75 Top Practice Areas"

Course information
Sycamore Hills has a clubhouse, pro shop, driving range, putting green, and restaurant. 

The 18-hole course has a Par of 72 with 5 sets of tees: 
Gold, the back tees with a total length of 7,275 yards
Blue, the second-to-last tees with a total length of 6,765 yards
White, the third-to-last tees with a total length of 6,258 yards
Green, the fourth-to-last tees with a total length of 5,812 yards
Red, the last tees with a total length of 5,232 yards

References

External links

Golf clubs and courses in Indiana
Buildings and structures in Allen County, Indiana